Podon leuckartii is a species of onychopod in the family Podonidae.

References

Further reading

 

Cladocera
Articles created by Qbugbot
Crustaceans described in 1862